Laurence Marks (August 23, 1915 – January 1, 1993) was an American writer for radio and television shows including Hogan's Heroes and M*A*S*H. He received an award from the Writers Guild of America.

According to M*A*S*H creator Larry Gelbart, he and Marks teamed up in 1946 to write for Jack Paar on radio, then moved to writing for Bob Hope at $1,250 a week each.

Selected filmography

References

External links
 

American radio writers
American television writers
American male television writers
Writers from Atlantic City, New Jersey
Writers Guild of America Award winners
1915 births
1993 deaths
20th-century American businesspeople
Screenwriters from New Jersey
20th-century American screenwriters
20th-century American male writers
Television producers from New Jersey